Auratonota petalocrossa is a species of moth of the family Tortricidae. It is found in Costa Rica and Colombia.

Adults are somewhat variable in having more or less pale and broad surfaces of ground colour, reduced parts of markings or broad markings and slender elements of ground colour suffused with brown.

References

Moths described in 1926
Auratonota
Moths of Central America
Moths of South America